The Hero Honda Hunk is a 150cc motorcycle launched by Hero Honda in October 2007. It is offered in two variants, kick start and self-start. The new 2011 model is offered with either rear disc brake, or rear drum brake.

Comfort and handling
The Hunk has a stepped seat and rear-set foot pegs that give the rider a sporty stance without sacrificing rider comfort. The vibrations are well controlled. The bike also features gas-charged adjustable rear shock absorbers and rear tire with a tuff-up tube with 100/90-18".

Performance and fuel economy
The Hunk has the  engine used in the Honda Unicorn and the Hero Honda CBZ X-treme, with Advanced Tumble-Flow induction Technology (ATFT) which the company claims will reduce emissions and fuel consumption. The new upgraded Hunk comes with a semi-digital dashboard, ridged exhaust cover with front and rear disc brakes, tubeless tires and contoured visor. After recent cosmetic changes, the bike still retains its single-cylinder, air-cooled 149.2cc engine. Hero Honda Hunk is expected to attain 118kmph at 9500rpm.

Awards
The Hunk has won the NDTV Profit Car India & Bike India Awards Viewers’ Choice Award in the bike category.

Insignia
The Hunk features its own unique racing bull insignia on either side edges of the fuel tank. The bull insignia has worked well to communicate it as a macho bike that reaffirms the idea of manliness that is associated with rugged biking. The bull is featured on its shrouds.

Related bikes
Hero Honda Ambition 135 
Hero Honda Karizma R 
Hero Splendor 
Hero Honda Super Splendor 
Hero Passion 
Hero Pleasure 
Hero Honda Achiever 
Honda Shine 
Honda Unicorn 
Hero Honda CBZ 
Hero Honda Karizma 
Hero Honda Karizma ZMR
Honda Activa

References

External links
 Official website
 Hero Hunk accessories

Hunk
Motorcycles introduced in 2007
Sport touring motorcycles